Prince Zhi may refer to either of the following:

 Prince Shen (慎郡王), a Qing dynasty princely peerage created in 1735, renamed to Prince Zhi (質郡王) in 1772
 Prince Zhi (直) (直郡王), a Qing dynasty princely peerage created in 1698
 Yunzhi, Prince Zhi, the first Prince Zhi in this peerage
 The Daoguang Emperor of the Qing dynasty, known as Prince Zhi (智親王) before his coronation in 1820